Help Me to Live is a 1936  Argentine romantic drama musical directed and written by José A. Ferreyra with Libertad Lamarque. Starring Libertad Lamarque and Santiago Gómez Cou, the film premiered on 26 August 1936 in Buenos Aires.

The film is a tango-based film, an integral part of Argentine culture.

Main cast
Libertad Lamarque as  Luisita
Floren Delbene as  Julio
Perla Mary as  Mariluz
Delia Durruty as Teresa
Lalo Harbín as Federico
Santiago Gómez Cou as  Enrique

External links
 

Argentine musical drama films
1936 films
1930s Spanish-language films
Argentine black-and-white films
1936 romantic drama films
Tango films
Films directed by José A. Ferreyra
1930s romantic musical films
Argentine romantic musical films
Argentine romantic drama films
1930s Argentine films